Breiðdalsvík Airport  is an airport serving Breiðdalsvík, Iceland.

See also
Transport in Iceland
List of airports in Iceland

References

 Google Earth

External links
 OurAirports - Breiðdalsvík
 OpenStreetMap - Breiðdalsvík
 Breiðdalsvík Airport

Airports in Iceland